The DP900A7A-S01 is an all-in-one desktop computer with a 27" 3D display developed by Samsung.

Specifications 
The Samsung DP900 features an Intel Core i7-2600S 2.8 GHz CPU, 8 GB DDR3 RAM, 1 TB SATA 7200RPM HDD, a Blu-ray/DVD combo drive, wireless keyboard and mouse, a 27" 3D LED display with 16:9 widescreen aspect ratio and full HD resolution (1920 x 1080), and high quality sound optimized by JBL. The graphics card is an AMD Radeon HD 6730M. The DP900 has several ports, including a headphone, a microphone, 4 USB 2.0 and 2 USB 3.0 ports, a multicard slot, an antenna in, HDMI in and out, and a LAN port. The computer also supports Wi-Fi (IEEE 802.11b, IEEE 802.11g, IEEE 802.11n) and Bluetooth. The DP900 has been released with the 64-bit Windows 7 Home Premium operating system.

References 

IBM PC compatibles